Digital Envoy, Inc., part of Dominion Enterprises, is a media and information services company. It is the parent company of Digital Element and Digital Resolve, whose primary product is the NetAcuity IP location service.

Company & History
Founded in 1999 by Rob Friedman, Sanjay Parekh and Dennis Maicon, Digital Envoy patented, and introduced geotargeting technology (also recognized as geolocation or IP location technology). In 2005, Digital Envoy created two business units: Digital Element and Digital Resolve. In 2007, Landmark Communications, Inc. purchased Digital Envoy. The company became part of Dominion Enterprises in 2009.

Digital Envoy, through its Digital Element business unit, is often considered to be the main supplier of IP targeting technology to the online advertising industry.  According to AdOps Insider, "practically speaking, most of the advertising industry relies on a small company called Digital Envoy" for IP address geolocation of advertisements.

References

Mass media companies of the United States
Geomarketing
Data collection